Marko Kizikj (born 22 January 2001) is a Macedonian handball player who plays for RK Eurofarm Pelister and the Macedonian national team.

Accomplishment 
Domestic competitions
 Macedonian Handball Super League
 Winner (1):  2020–2021

 Macedonian Handball Cup
 Winner (1):  2021

Other competitions
 SEHA League
 Runner Up (5):2019–20

References
https://24rakomet.mk/%d0%ba%d0%b8%d0%b7%d0%b8%d1%9c-%d1%83%d1%88%d1%82%d0%b5-%d0%bd%d0%b5%d0%bc%d0%b0-%d0%bf%d0%be%d1%82%d0%bf%d0%b8%d1%88%d0%b0%d0%bd%d0%be-%d0%b4%d0%be%d0%b3%d0%be%d0%b2%d0%be%d1%80-%d0%bd%d0%be-%d1%9c/
https://24rakomet.mk/%d0%b1%d1%80%d0%b5%d1%81%d1%82%d0%be%d0%b2%d0%b0%d1%86-%d1%81%d0%be-%d0%b4%d0%b2%d0%b5-%d0%b8%d0%b7%d0%bc%d0%b5%d0%bd%d0%b8-%d0%b7%d0%b0-%d0%b2%d1%82%d0%be%d1%80%d0%b8%d0%be%d1%82-%d0%bc%d0%b5%d1%87/

2001 births
Living people
Macedonian male handball players
Sportspeople from Skopje
Mediterranean Games competitors for North Macedonia
Competitors at the 2022 Mediterranean Games
21st-century Macedonian people